Motive is the second album from Red Box and was released in 1990.

Track listing
All songs written and composed by Simon Toulson-Clarke, except where noted.

East West Records LP: WX381

East West Records CD: WX381CD

2011 - Cherry Pop CD: CR POP 80

Personnel
Musicians
Simon Toulson-Clarke - Vocals, Acoustic guitar
Steve Carter - Bass
Alastair Gavin - Keyboards
Neil Taylor - Electric guitar, Acoustic guitar
Chris Wyles - Drums, Percussion, Programming

Additional musicians
Backing vocals - Steve Carter, Stephanie Johnson, Martin Noakes, Sue Thomas, Jennie Tsao, Mari Wilson
Kick Horns:Simon Clarke - Alto saxophone, Baritone saxophone, Flute Roddy Lorimer - Trumpet, FlugelhornTim Saunders - Tenor sax
Trombone - Peter Thoms
Additional percussion - Luis Jardim
Train sound designer - Jesper Siberg (the Dane with the DAT)
S1000 programming on "Train" - Brian Pugsley
Percussion on "Casbah" - Sam Ramzy

Production
Produced by Jon Kelly, Alastair Gavin and Simon Toulson-Clarke
"Train", "Casbah" and "Train (Fantasy Island Version)" produced by David Motion and Simon Toulson-Clarke
"Walk on My Hands" and "Soldier of Love" additional production and mixed by David Motion
Engineered by Hugo Nicholson, Richard Moakes
"Train" and "Casbah" engineered by Felix Kendall
Orchestral arrangements by Gavin Wright and Alistair Gavin
Horns arranged by the Kick Horns
"Now Ask" horns arranged by Kicks Horns and Alistair Gavin
"Train (Fantasy Island Version)" remixed by Marc Fox
Sleeve by Industria

References

1990 albums
Red Box (band) albums
Albums produced by Jon Kelly
East West Records albums